The Roman Catholic Diocese of Oruro is a diocese located in the city of Oruro in the Ecclesiastical province of Cochabamba in Bolivia.

History
 November 11, 1924: Established as Diocese of Oruro from the Metropolitan Archdiocese of La Plata

Bishops

Ordinaries (listed in reverse chronological order)
 Bishops of Oruro (Roman rite)
 Bishop Krzysztof Bialasik Wawrowska (2005.06.30 – present)
 Bishop Braulio Sáez Garcia, O.C.D. (1991.11.07 – 2003.09.11)
 Bishop Julio Terrazas Sandoval, C.SS.R. (1982.01.09 – 1991.02.06), appointed Archbishop of Santa Cruz de la Sierra; future Cardinal
 Bishop René Fernández Apaza (1968.03.02 – 1981.11.21), appointed Coadjutor Archbishop of Sucre
 Bishop Jorge Manrique Hurtado (1956.07.28 – 1967.07.27), appointed Archbishop of La Paz
 Bishop Luis Aníbal Rodríguez Pardo (1953.06.17 – 1956.07.28), appointed Coadjutor Bishop of Cochabamba; future Archbishop
 Bishop Bertoldo Bühl, O.F.M. (1951.10.26 – 1953.06.17)
 Bishop Riccardo Chavez Alcazar (1938.01.27 – 1949.09.30)
 Bishop Abel Isidoro Antezana y Rojas, C.M.F. (1924.11.13 – 1938.01.16), appointed Bishop of La Paz; future Archbishop

Auxiliary bishop
Braulio Sáez Garcia, O.C.D. (1987-1991), appointed Bishop here

See also
Roman Catholicism in Bolivia

References

External links
 GCatholic.org

Roman Catholic dioceses in Bolivia
Christian organizations established in 1924
Roman Catholic dioceses and prelatures established in the 20th century
Oruro, Roman Catholic Diocese of
1924 establishments in Bolivia
Diocese